Hugin is a cross-platform open source panorama photo stitching and HDR merging program developed by Pablo d'Angelo and others. It is a GUI front-end for Helmut Dersch's Panorama Tools and Andrew Mihal's Enblend and Enfuse. Stitching is accomplished by using several overlapping photos taken from the same location, and using control points to align and transform the photos so that they can be blended together to form a larger image. Hugin allows for the easy (optionally automatic) creation of control points between two images, optimization of the image transforms along with a preview window so the user can see whether the panorama is acceptable. Once the preview is correct, the panorama can be fully stitched, transformed and saved in a standard image format.

Features
Hugin and the associated tools can be used to
 combine overlapping images for panoramic photography
 correct complete panorama images, e.g. those that are "wavy" due to a badly levelled panoramic camera
 stitch large mosaics of images and photos, e.g. of long walls or large microscopy samples
 find control points and optimize parameters with the help of software assistants/wizards
 output several projection types, such as equirectangular (used by many full spherical viewers), mercator, cylindrical, stereographic, and sinusoidal
 perform advanced photometric corrections and HDR stitching

With the release of 2010.4.0, which includes a built-in control point generator, the developers consider Hugin to be feature-complete.

Development

Infrastructure 
The Hugin development is tracked on Launchpad and the code resides in a Mercurial repository.

Google Summer of Code
Five projects for the development of Hugin / panotools were accepted for the 2007 Google Summer of Code. Additionally a sixth, community sponsored project has been set up. The projects were:
 Automatic feature detection by Pedro Alonso (Spain), mentored by Herbert Bay (Switzerland)
 New modular GUI by Ippei Ukai (Japan), mentored by Yuval Levy (Canada), who is also the lead administrator on the Summer of Code effort
 HDR de-ghosting by Jing Jin (USA), mentored by Pablo d'Angelo (Germany) who is also the lead developer on Hugin
 Large image processing with VIPS by Mohammad Shahiduzzaman (Bangladesh), mentored by John Cupitt (United Kingdom)
 Interactive Panorama Viewer by Leon Moctezuma (Mexico),  mentored by Aldo Hoeben (The Netherlands)
 Community project: PTbatcher by Zoran Mesec (Slovenija), mentored by Daniel M. German (Canada)

Hugin was also accepted to Summer of Code 2008. Projects were:
 Fast, OpenGL accelerated preview by James Alastair Legg, mentored by Pablo d'Angelo
 Automated feature matching by Onur Kucuktunc, mentored by Alexandre Jenny
 User interface for masking of images by Fahim Mannan, mentored by Daniel M. German
 Batch processing ability by Marko Kuder, mentored by Zoran Mesec
 Automatic detection of non-static features in imagery (final application is called Celeste) by Timothy Nugent, mentored by Yuval Levy

In 2009 Google Summer of Code projects were as follows:
 Ghost removal for Enfuse by Luka Jirkovsky, mentored by Andrew Mihal
 Layout model by James Legg, mentored by Bruno Postle
 Automatic lens calibration by detecting straight lines in pictures by Timothy Nugent, mentored by Tom Sharpless
 and fourth project for porting LightTwist to Mac OS X by Yulia Kotseruba, mentored by Sébastien Roy.

In 2010 the Google Summer of Code projects were:
 implementing a patent-free image feature detector and control point generator by Antoine Deleforge, mentored by Timothy Nugent.
 creating a new interactive panorama overview, by Darko Makreshanski and mentored by James Legg
 improving the make file libraries used in panorama stitching and
 adding regression tests for libpano13

In 2011 the GSoC project was centered around Enblend's seam line optimization algorithm using graph-cut algorithm.

See also

Comparison of photo stitching software

References

External links

 
 Hugin mailing list for users and developers
 OpenPhotoVR is a similar open-source software project
 Panotools Next Generation wiki
 Google Summer of Code project description
 

2003 software
BSD software
Free software
Free graphics software
Free photo software
Free photo stitching software
Free software programmed in C++
Panorama software
Windows graphics-related software
MacOS graphics software
Photo software for Linux
Photo stitching software
Photo software
Software that uses wxWidgets
HDR tone mapping software